Thammil Thammil is a 1985 Indian Malayalam-language film, directed by  Sajan and produced by Thomas Mathew. The film stars Mammootty, Rahman, Shobhana and Thilakan. The film has musical score by Ravindran.

Cast
Mammootty as Dr. Rajagopal
Archana (actress) as Gayathri
Rahman as Vivek Menon
Shobhana as Kavitha
Jose as Dr. Prasad
Raveendran  as Thampy
Kannor Sreelatha as Sunitha Menon
Jagathy Sreekumar as Const. Fransis
Kunchan as Const. Chettiyar
Thilakan as Menon
Sukumari as Saraswathy Menon
Lalu Alex
Sankaradi
Adoor Bhavani
Meena
Lissy in a cameo appearance

Plot
Vivek, a talented dancer and singer, meets Kavitha during one of his performances and takes a liking to her. She is the sister of Dr Rajagopal. When Vivek's sister marries a police inspector and Vivek learns that they are searching for a house for rent, he manages to get the house opposite Rajagopal's in order to meet Kavitha. After several meetings their love blossoms.

Soundtrack
Music: Raveendran, Lyrics: Poovachal Khader
 "Hridayam Oru Veenayaay" - K. J. Yesudas
 "Ithiri Naanam" - K. J. Yesudas, Lathika
 "Kadanam Oru Saagaram" - K. J. Yesudas
 "Nishayude Chirakil" - K. J. Yesudas

References

External links

1985 films
1980s Malayalam-language films
Films directed by Sajan